The 817th Expeditionary Airlift Squadron is a provisional United States Air Force unit, assigned to Air Mobility Command  to activate or inactivate as needed. It engaged in combat operations in Southwest Asia.

The squadron was first activated during World War II as the 817th Bombardment Squadron.  It trained in the southeastern United States, then was one of the last Boeing B-17 Flying Fortress heavy bomber squadrons to deploy to Italy as part of the Fifteenth Air Force 483d Bombardment Group.  It engaged in the strategic bombing campaign against Germany, earning two Distinguished Unit Citations for its actions.  Following V-E Day, the squadron's bombers acted as transports in the Green Project transporting American soldiers back to the United States until inactivating in Italy in September 1945.

In 1953, the squadron was redesignated the 817th Troop Carrier Squadron and activated in Japan to replace a reserve unit that had been mobilized for the Korean War and was reverting to reserve status.  It supported combat operations in Korea before the signing of the armistice, adding a Korean Presidential Unit Citation award to its honors.  The squadron continued to perform airlift operations in the Pacific area after the end of hostilities in Korea.  In 1954, it flew airlift support for French forces fighting the Viet Minh in French Indochina.  During the Vietnam War, the squadron deployed aircrews and aircraft to Southeast Asia until it was inactivated in 1970, earning a Republic of Vietnam Gallantry Cross with Palm.

History

World War II

The squadron was activated at Ephrata Army Air Base as the 817th Bombardment Squadron (Heavy) on 20 September 1943 as one of the four original squadrons of the 483d Bombardment Group. In November, the squadron moved to MacDill Field, Florida, where it trained with Boeing B-17 Flying Fortresses under Third Air Force, as Second Air Force began to concentrate on very heavy bomber training.

The 817th deployed to the Mediterranean Theater of Operations, where it became part of Fifteenth Air Force at Sterparone Airfield in Southern Italy.  The squadron's air element flew its Flying Fortresses to Sterparone via Tortorella Airfield, while the ground element moved to Sterparone via troop ship.  It began operations in April 1944 with an attack on a cement factory in Split, Yugoslavia.

The squadron engaged in strategic bombing campaign against Germany, striking military, industrial and transport targets, including factories, oil refineries, marshalling yards, airfields, and troop concentrations in Italy, France. Southern Germany, Austria, Czechoslovakia, and the Balkans.  In June 1944, the squadron participated in a shuttle mission, departing Italy and landing in the Soviet Union, attacking targets en route and on the return flight.  This enabled attacks on targets too far from the squadron's base to strike and return home.  The squadron received a Distinguished Unit Citation for combat action two months later.  On 18 July 1944 the squadron, along with the other elements of the 483d Group, bombed the objective, an airfield and installations at Memmingen, engaging numerous enemy aircraft in the target area despite a lack of cover from its planned fighter escort.  It received a second citation for braving fighter assaults and flak to bomb tank factories at Berlin on 24 March 1945.

The squadron was occasionally diverted from the strategic attack on Germany. It struck targets in southern France in preparation for Operation Dragoon, the invasion of August 1944.  The group also supported ground forces in northern Italy during Operation Grapeshot, the Allied offensive in April 1945.

After V-E Day, the unit moved to Pisa Airfield, where it operated under the control of Air Transport Command's Green Project which was the movement of troops back to the United States.  The squadron carried troops from Pisa to a staging area in Morocco.  Its B-17s were disarmed with flooring and seats for 25 passengers installed.  It carried passengers from Pisa to Port Lyautey Airfield, French Morocco for further movement them across the Atlantic.  The squadron was inactivated in Italy in September 1945.

Korean War

The Air Force was returning the 403d Troop Carrier Wing, which was stationed at Ashiya Air Base during the Korean War to reserve status at the beginning of 1953.  The 403d Wing had been mobilized in April 1951 and had moved to Japan a year later.  In its place, the Air Force activated the 483d Troop Carrier Wing.  The 817th was activated as the 817th Troop Carrier Squadron and absorbed the mission, personnel and Fairchild C-119 Flying Boxcars of the 65th Troop Carrier Squadron, which was simultaneously inactivated.

In June 1953, the squadron, along with the other squadrons of the 483d Wing airlifted the 187th Regimental Combat Team from Japan to Korea, to prevent a breakthrough by North Korean and Chinese Communist forces before an armistice agreement could be signed.  It performed troop carrier and air transport operations in the Far East, including landing of troops and cargo in forward areas of the combat zone, air transportation of airborne troops and equipment, and air evacuation of casualties, receiving a Korean Presidential Unit Citation for these actions.  For its actions in transporting United Nations troops in Korea and training with airborne units, the squadron was one of the first units to earn an Air Force Outstanding Unit Award.  Between April 1953 and September 1954, the squadron aided the French Air Force in Indochina by training personnel and hauling supplies.  In 1958, the 483d Group was inactivated as Far East Air Forces converted to the dual-deputy organizational model and the squadron was reassigned directly to the wing.  That same year, the squadron began conversion to the Lockheed C-130A Hercules, losing its last Flying Boxcar in 1959.

Vietnam War

On 25 June 1960, the Air Force turned Ashiya Air Base over to the Japanese Air Self Defense Force and the 483d Wing was inactivated.  The squadron moved to Naha Air Base, Okinawa, where it was assigned directly to the 315th Air Division.  It continued intratheater transport operations, also flying to locations in the Philippines, Thailand and Indochina, supporting United States civilian and military personnel assigned to the region.  As the United States increased its combat presence in Indochina in the early 1960s, made frequent flights to airfields in South Vietnam and to locations within the country, periodically deploying crews and aircraft there.  As in South Korea, the flights within South Vietnam were extremely hazardous as the squadron operated within combat areas and frequently were under fire from communist forces during takeoff, landing and ground operations. The squadron inactivated in June 1970.

Expeditionary operations
The squadron was converted to provisional status in 2002 and assigned to Air Mobility Command (AMC) to activate and inactivate as needed.

The squadron was active in 2003 and 2004 at Rhein-Main Air Base, Germany, when it was responsible for controlling strategic airlift operations staging through Rhein-Main and Ramstein Air Bases, Germany to Iraq and Afghanistan areas of operation.

The squadron was active a second time at Incirlik Air Base, Turkey, flying Boeing C-17 Globemaster IIIs with crews rotating from the four squadrons of the 62d Airlift Wing and of its reserve associate 446th Airlift Wing at McChord Air Force Base, Washington as part of the Global War on Terrorism.   The squadron provided strategic airlift, aeromedical evacuation and humanitarian support for Operation Enduring Freedom and Operation New Dawn.  It operated as part of AMC's two expeditionary airlift squadron model, operating outside the theater of operations, while the 816th Expeditionary Airlift Squadron handled C-17 operations within the theater.

Lineage
 Constituted as the 817th Bombardment Squadron (Heavy) on 14 September 1943
 Activated on 20 September 1943
 Redesignated 817th Bombardment Squadron, Heavy c. September 1944
 Inactivated on 25 September 1945
 Redesignated 817th Troop Carrier Squadron, Medium on 15 November 1952
 Activated on 1 January 1953
 Redesignated 817th Troop Carrier Squadron on 8 December 1965
 Redesignated 817th Tactical Airlift Squadron on 1 August 1967
 Inactivated on 15 June 1970
 Redesignated 817th Expeditionary Airlift Squadron and converted to provisional status, on 12 June 2002
 Active by April 2003 through February 2004
 Active by March 2006
 Inactivated c. 1 April 2014

Assignments
 483d Bombardment Group, 20 September 1943 – 25 September 1945
 483d Troop Carrier Group, 1 January 1953
 483d Troop Carrier Wing, 8 December 1958
 315th Air Division, 25 June 1960 (attached to 6315th Operations Group)
 374th Troop Carrier Wing (later 374th Tactical Airlift Wing), 8 August 1966 – 15 June 1970
 Air Mobility Command to activate or inactivate at any time after 12 June 2002
 362d Air Expeditionary Group, c. 11 April 2003-2004
 385th Air Expeditionary Group, 2006-c. 1 April 2014

Stations
 Ephrata Army Air Base, Washington, 20 September 1943
 MacDill Field, Florida, 7 November 1943 – 2 March 1944
 Sterparone Airfield, Italy, 9 April 1944
 Pisa Airfield, Italy, 15 May 1945 – 25 September 1945
 Ashiya Air Base, Japan, 1 January 1953
 Naha Air Base, Okinawa, 25 June 1960 – 15 June 1970
 Rhein-Main Air Base, Germany, c. 11 April 2003 – 2004
 Incirlik Air Base, Turkey, by September 2006-c. 1 April 2014

Aircraft
 Boeing B-17 Flying Fortress, 1943–1945
 Fairchild C-119 Flying Boxcar, 1953–1959
 Lockheed C-130 Hercules, 1958–1970
 Boeing C-17 Globemaster III, 2006–2014

Awards and campaigns

See also

 Boeing B-17 Flying Fortress Units of the Mediterranean Theater of Operations

References
Notes

Citations

Bibliography

 
 
 

Airlift squadrons of the United States Air Force